Stattegg is a Village and a suburb of Graz, the capital of the Austrian state of Styria. It lies at the bottom of the Schoeckl, a mountain of the European Alps.
Stattegg has 2982 inhabitants (as of 1 January 2021) and consists of 13 Katastralgemeinden: Buch, Eichberg, Hochgreit, Hohenberg, Hub, Kalkleiten, Krail, Leber, Mühl, Neudorf, Rannach, Steingraben, Ursprung.

History
In medieval times the Stadecker were a dynasty of ministeriales in the service of the sovereign of Styria. Their seat was the castle of Stadeck located in Hub, a part of Stattegg. Ulrich I von Stadeck was 26th arch bishop of Salzburg (1256–1265), Rudolf von Stadegge was a minstrel, several were Landeshauptmann of Styria. 1400 the dynasty ended with Hans and Leuthold of Stadeck. Since 1951, the castle hill has been used by the Stattegg Volunteer Fire Fighters as a training ground.

Objects of Interest

 Church Maria Schutz in Kalkleiten
 Old lime kiln (founded 1890, stopped 1966, classified as a historical monument since 1981)
 Well of Andritz-Ursprung (Jakob-Lorber Begegnungsstätte)

Citizens of honor

Citizens of honor 

 1952 Josef Krainer (1903–1971), Landeshauptmann
 1952 Ulrich Lässer, Gemeinderat
 1954 Heribert Ringer, Bürgermeister 1951–1965
 1965 Alexander Mayer
 1978 Friedrich Niederl (1920–2012), Landeshauptmann
 1978 Eduard Matzenauer, Bürgermeister 1965–1988
 1984 Josef Krainer Jr. (1930–2016), Landeshauptmann
 2006 Helmut Möstl, Bürgermeister 1988–2006

Relevant people, related to Stattegg 

 Franz Feiertag (* 5. Dezember 1955 in Graz), European Champion in TREC 2010
 Florian Kainz (* 24. Oktober 1992), Austrian soccer player

External links
 private weatherstation (german)

References

Graz Highlands
Cities and towns in Graz-Umgebung District